The 1999 Southern Conference baseball tournament was held at Joseph P. Riley Jr. Park in Charleston, South Carolina, from May 19 through 22. Top seeded The Citadel won the tournament and earned the Southern Conference's automatic bid to the 1999 NCAA Division I baseball tournament. It was the Bulldogs fifth tournament win.

The tournament used a double-elimination format. Only the top eight teams participate, so Appalachian State, Davidson, and Furman were not in the field.

Seeding

Bracket

All-Tournament Team

References 

Tournament
Southern Conference Baseball Tournament
Southern Conference baseball tournament
Southern Conference baseball tournament